Jaffa Port is an ancient port situated on the Mediterranean Sea. It is located in Old Jaffa within Jaffa, Tel Aviv, Israel. The port serves as a fishing harbour, a yacht harbour, and as a tourist destination. It offers a variety of cultural and food options, including restaurants where fresh fish and seafood is served.

History
Jaffa Port is mentioned in various ancient works, including in the Hebrew Bible (namely the Book of Jonah) and in the works of Josephus describing Jewish history and the First Jewish–Roman War. It has been in active usage for over 7,000 years, predating even ancient Egypt. Still functional as a small fishing port, it is currently a recreational zone featuring restaurants and cafés. A lighthouse, Jaffa Light, is located above the port.

In 1917, during World War I, British troops under Edmund Allenby defeated the Ottoman Empire and took Jaffa, which then became part of Mandatory Palestine. In 1947 and 1948, there was sharp fighting between Jaffa, which was largely inhabited by Arabs, and Tel Aviv, which was largely inhabited by Jews. On 13 May 1948 (a day before the Israeli Declaration of Independence), Arab forces in Jaffa were defeated after a lengthy fight with the Haganah and the Irgun. On 24 April 1950, the Jewish city of Tel Aviv and the Arab city of Jaffa were unified under the Tel Aviv-Yafo Municipality.

References

External links

Geography of Tel Aviv
Old Jaffa
Ports and harbours of Israel
Tourist attractions in Tel Aviv